The 8th constituency of the Rhône (French: Huitième circonscription du Rhône) is a French legislative constituency in the Rhône département. Like the other 576 French constituencies, it elects one MP using a two round electoral system.

Description

The 8th constituency of the Rhône lies in the north of the department and is largely rural in character.

The voters of the 8th have consistently returned conservative deputies to the National Assembly, this seat being one of only two in the department to resist the En Marche! landslide in 2017.

Assembly Members

Election results

2022

 
 
 
 
 
|-
| colspan="8" bgcolor="#E9E9E9"|
|-

2017

 
 
 
 
 
|-
| colspan="8" bgcolor="#E9E9E9"|
|-

2012

 
 
 
 
 
|-
| colspan="8" bgcolor="#E9E9E9"|
|-

2007

 
 
 
 
 
 
 
|-
| colspan="8" bgcolor="#E9E9E9"|
|-

2002

 
 
 
 
|-
| colspan="8" bgcolor="#E9E9E9"|
|-

1997

 
 
 
 
 
 
 
|-
| colspan="8" bgcolor="#E9E9E9"|
|-

References

8